Below is a list of newspapers in Algeria.

Arabic language
Ech-Chaab الشعب
Echorouk - الشروق
El Ayem El Djazairia - الأيام الجزائرية
El Hayat - الحياة
El Khabar - الخبر
El Massa - المساء
El Moudjahid - المجاهد
Ennahar - النهار

French language 
Algérie Actualité
L'Algérie Libre
Alger Républicain
El Acil
El Watan
La Cité
L'Expression
Le Matin
Le Quotidien d'Oran
Le Soir d'Algérie
Liberté (Algeria)

English language

 The Algiers Herald (online only)

 Algerian Gazette (online only)

See also
 Media of Algeria
 List of radio stations in Africa: Algeria
 Television in Algeria
 Internet in Algeria

References

Bibliography

External links

 The North Africa Journal -جريدة شمال إفريقيا, official website.
 Algerian Newspapers and News Sites List of Algerian newspapers and online news sites in English.
 Newspapers In Algeria,  website.
 

Algeria
Lists of mass media in Algeria